Bytes Technology Group is a reseller of computer software in Leatherhead, Surrey, England. It is listed on the London Stock Exchange and is a constituent of the FTSE 250 Index.

History
The business was established in a shop in Epsom in 1982. It was acquired by Allied Electronics Corporation (Altron), a company led by the entrepreneur, Bill Venter, in 1998. The company was demerged from Altron and was subject to an initial public offering on the London Stock Exchange in December 2020.

Operations
The company is a reseller of computer software, principally of products made by Microsoft, but also of cloud storage, computer security and computer asset management software. It was the largest reseller of Microsoft's Azure cloud computing software product in the UK during the year ended 30 June 2019.

References

External links
Official site

Software companies established in 1982